Pirate Corps may refer to:

 The Pirate Corps from the fictional anime series Gundam Seed. The Pirate Corps is an anonymous group of ex-Junk Guild members and soldiers from various groups, who salvage and heavily modify existing suits to invade ships for cargo
 Pirate Corp$, a comic book by Evan Dorkin, later retitled Hectic Planet